Budišov nad Budišovkou is a town in Opava District in the Moravian-Silesian Region of the Czech Republic. It has about 2,900 inhabitants. The historic town centre is well preserved and is protected by law as an urban monument zone.

Administrative parts

Villages of Guntramovice, Podlesí and Staré Oldřůvky are administrative parts of Budišov nad Budišovkou.

Etymology
The name Budišov is derived either from the name of the abbot of the Hradisko Monastery named Budiš or from the word búda ("miner's house").

Geography

The town lies on the Budišovka Stream. Kružberk Reservoir on the Moravice River lies on the northern border of the municipal territory.

History

The first written mention of Budišov nad Budišovkou is from 1301, a forest on the site of the settlement was mentioned in 1239. The settlement was originally founded as a mining community next to silver and lead mines in 13th century and soon became a town. Budišov was owned by the bishops of Olomouc and during their rule in the 16th century, the greatest prosperity of the town has taken place. Trade and crafts were developed.

The prosperity ended with the Thirty Years' War, during which the town was almost destroyed and repeatedly looted. It was then severely damaged during the Seven Years' War by marching troops. Budišov became impoverished and began to suffer from its remoteness and distance from all the main roads. The town had to be financially assisted by the government around 1870. In 1876, a tobacco factory was opened here, which employed 1,000 people at the beginning of the 20th century. In 1891 the railway was opened.

Until 1918, the town of Bautsch was part of the Austrian monarchy (Austria side after the compromise of 1867), in the Sternberg (Šternberk) district, one of the 34 Bezirkshauptmannschaften in Moravia.

In 1938, after the Munich Agreement, it was occupied by the Nazi army as one of the municipalities in Sudetenland, one of the 6 towns of County Bärn. The German-speaking population, which formed to majority of the town's population, was expelled in 1945 according to the Beneš decrees The town was resettled by Czech families.

Economy
Budišov nad Budišovkou is known for slate mining. It has been mined here since the 18th century. There are several former mines and one active mine, reopened in 2015. It is the only open underground mine in the Czech Republic.

Sights

The Church of the Assumption of the Virgin Mary was built in the late Baroque style in 1745–1755. The interior includes a late Gothic statue of the Madonna and Child from around 1500.

Notable is a Baroque stone bridge with a statue of Saint John of Nepomuk. Next to the bridge is a water mill, which houses the Slate Museum.

Notable people
Franz Ignatz Cassian Hallaschka (1780–1847), physicist, rector of Charles University in Prague
Ernst Kuntscher (1899–1971), German politician
Oskar Schnirch (1902–1995), Austrian cinematographer

Twin towns – sister cities

Budišov nad Budišovkou is twinned with:
 Głubczyce County, Poland
 Mszana, Poland
 Stráňavy, Slovakia

References

External links

Cities and towns in the Czech Republic
Populated places in Opava District